Ambikasuthan Mangad is an Indian Malayalam language writer. He was a professor of Malayalam at Nehru Arts and Science College, Kanhangad. His literary contributions range from short stories to novels in Malayalam. He has written more than 40 books.

He is active in protests against the known pesticide Endosulfan. His novel Enmakaje portrays the life of victims in the village Enmakaje of Kasaragod. "Neelakandan" is the famous character in this novel. His work drew international attention of the people to this malady. His book has played a major role in banning the pesticide. The novel Enmakaje has translated into English by J. Devika as Swarga. Enmakaje was translated to Tamil and Kannada languages also.

Personal life 
Born in Bare village in Kasargod district on 8 October 1962, Ambikasutan Mangad holds a Bachelor of Science degree in Zoology, a Master's Degree in Malayalam and an MPhil. He was a professor at Nehru College of Arts and Science, Kanhangad. Presently he's full time engaged in activism.

Major works 

 Enmakaje (2009)
 Randu Malsyangal
 Neeraaliyan
Marakkappile theyyangal
Sadharana Veshangal
Rathri
Jeevithathinte Mudra
Othenante Vaal

Films

Ambikasuthan Mangad wrote the script and dialogues for critically acclaimed movie Kaiyoppu.

Television 

Ambikasuthan Mangad won an award for the Best Story writer from Kerala State Government for the telefilm Commercial Break.

Awards 

 2000 - Commercial Break - Edasseri Memorial Award
2004 - Marakkappile theyyangal - Cherukad Award
2005 - Abu Dhabi Sakthi Award (Novel)
 2014 - Neeraaliyan - Sathyalal Anusmaras Award
2015 - Prof. Sivaprasad Foundation Award for the best college teacher in Kerala
2017 - Ente priyappetta kadhakal (collection of short-stories) - Deshabhimani sahithya puraskaram
2022 - Pranavayu (collection of short-stories) - Odakkuzhal Award
Ankanam award
Ithal puraskaram
V.P. Sivakumar Keli award
Malayayattoor prize
SBT award 
VT Bhattathirippad award
Kovilan award

Notes and references

External links
 https://kaitholil.com/?product=malayalam-novel-ghatikarangalude-sookshippukaran-by-ambikasuthan-mangad-published-by-mathrubhumi-books
 
 http://www.nasc.ac.in
 http://www.edasseri.org/english/memorial_awards.htm
 http://www.downtoearth.org.in/news/supreme-court-bans-endosulfan-33493

Malayalam-language writers
Writers from Kerala
Living people
People from Kasaragod district
21st-century Indian short story writers
1962 births
Recipients of the Abu Dhabi Sakthi Award